The Nevada State Capitol is the capitol building of the U.S. state of Nevada located in the state capital of Carson City at 101 North Carson Street. The building was constructed in the Neoclassical Italianate style between 1869 and 1871. It is listed in the National Register of Historic Places. It is also Nevada Historical Marker number 25.

Construction
Abraham Curry, the founder of Carson City, reserved an area equivalent to four city blocks (10 acres or 4.04 ha) at the center of the town for the future state capitol. When the Capitol building was constructed, it was naturally located on "the plaza", which had, some ten or eleven years earlier, been designated for it, and given for that purpose. Mark Twain wrote in his book Roughing It that the capitol site was in 1861 "a large, unfenced, level vacancy, with a liberty pole in it, and very useful as a place for public auctions, horse trades, mass meetings, and likewise for teamsters to camp in."

The "act to provide for the erection of a State Capitol" was passed by the Nevada Legislature and signed into law by Governor Henry G. Blasdel during 1869. The Board of Capitol Commissioners received bids of $84,000 to $160,000 for construction and they chose the lowest bid, submitted by Peter Cavanaugh and Son of Carson City. The 1869 act authorized $100,000 for construction, with money to come from a special tax levy, plus the proceeds from the sale of some public land. To reduce costs, the building sandstone was obtained free of charge from the Nevada State Prison quarry, just outside Carson City. In spite of this, the construction costs increased to some $170,000, exceeding even the high bid.

The cornerstone was laid on June 9, 1870. A brass box that served as a time capsule was deposited in the stone. The cornerstone was a solid block of sandstone, laid on top of blocks which contained the capsule. The capsule was inspected and returned to the cornerstone location (the northeast corner of the original building) during reconstruction in the 1979–81 period.

The fourth session of the state legislature met in the still-incomplete building at the beginning of 1871. Construction was completed by May 1, 1871. Several of the architect's original drawings are preserved in the state archives.

Architecture

The windows' glass panes are made of 26-ounce (737 g) French crystal, as are those above the doors. Floors and wainscotting are of Alaskan marble, shipped to San Francisco in 20-ton (18,144 kg) blocks and there cut and polished for installation.

The first floor contained a major office at each corner connected by central halls, while the wings of the second floor were filled by the two legislative chambers—the Assembly and the Senate. The octagonal dome topped with a cupola admitted light to the second story. During 1906, an octagonal Annex was added to the rear (east) of the capitol to house the State Library.

By the early 20th century, the legislature had outgrown the capitol, and prominent Nevada architect Frederic DeLongchamps was contracted to design northern and southern legislative wing-annexes, completed in time for the 1915 session. These compatible wings used stone from the same quarry as the original portion of the capitol, and provided more office space and expanded legislative chambers.

Usage
For more than 50 years, all three parts of the state government were housed in the Capitol. The Supreme Court met here until 1937, when it relocated into an adjacent building, and the Nevada Legislature met here until 1971, when it relocated to its new Legislative Building just south of the Capitol. Every Nevada governor except the first has had his office in the capitol. Nowadays, the Capitol continues to serve the Governor, and contains historical exhibits on the second floor.

Gallery

See also
 List of state and territorial capitols in the United States

References

External links
 
 State of Nevada Information about the State Capitol
 

Museums in Carson City, Nevada
History museums in Nevada
State capitols in the United States
Government buildings completed in 1871
Government buildings in Nevada
National Register of Historic Places in Carson City, Nevada
Government buildings with domes
Italianate architecture in Nevada
Neoclassical architecture in Nevada
Tourist attractions in Carson City, Nevada
Nevada State Register of Historic Places
Nevada historical markers
Historic American Buildings Survey in Nevada
Government buildings on the National Register of Historic Places in Nevada
Frederic Joseph DeLongchamps buildings